The Hampton Surf were formally known as the New York Empire. Frank Cuzzi was the president of the New York Hampton Surf who played in the American Indoor Soccer League during the 2006/2007 season.
Corner Kick International, LLC was the parent company of the Surf. The company provides soccer marketing and runs soccer camps in the New York area.

The Surf made their home on the East End of Long Island in the town of Town of Southampton.
The Surf played their home games at Southampton Youth Sports Center in the 2006/2007 season.

The Surf made their home debut December 9, 2006 in a 5–3 loss, against the Massachusetts Twisters.

Two members of the Surf and former Hofstra players were selected in the 2007 MLS Supplemental Draft. Michael Todd was selected by the Kansas City Wizards, and Gary Flood was selected by the New England Revolution. Both Todd and Flood helped the Surf earn their first victory, an 11–6 win over the Massachusetts Twisters, in the same weekend as their selection, January 20, 2007.

Year-By-Year

External links
Official site

American Indoor Soccer League teams
Men's soccer clubs in New York (state)
Defunct indoor soccer clubs in the United States
Association football clubs established in 2006
Association football clubs disestablished in 2007
2006 establishments in New York (state)
2007 disestablishments in New York (state)
Southampton (town), New York
Sports in Long Island